Aktyube may refer to:

 Aktyube, Almaty Region, Kazakhstan
 Aktyube, Astrakhan Oblast, Russia
 Ak-Tyube, Tajikistan

See also 
 Aktobe, Kazakhstan